Bogany Flats was a multi-storey block of flats in Castlemilk, Glasgow. The flats were built in 1966 by George Wimpey Ltd, the last of the nine tower blocks Whimpey built throughout the city in the sixties. The building was 20 stories high and contained 114 dwellings; locally it was known as 'The Hilton'.

On 28 March 1993, 30 Bogany Terrace was demolished using  of explosives, in what was to become the third successfully controlled explosion in Glasgow. Despite being the most recently built high-rise tower block in Castlemilk it was the first to be demolished, after standing for only 27 years.

See also
 Glasgow tower blocks

References

Residential buildings completed in 1966
Buildings and structures demolished in 1993
Residential skyscrapers in Scotland
Skyscrapers in Glasgow
Housing estates in Glasgow
Buildings and structures demolished by controlled implosion
Demolished buildings and structures in Scotland
1966 establishments in Scotland
1993 disestablishments in Scotland
Former skyscrapers